The Devil Is Driving may refer to:

The Devil Is Driving (1932 film), 1932 film directed by Benjamin Stoloff and starring Edmund Lowe
The Devil Is Driving (1937 film), 1937 film directed by Harry Lachman and starring Richard Dix, Joan Perry and Nana Bryant